This article contains a list of fossil-bearing stratigraphic units in the state of Rhode Island, U.S.

Sites

See also

 Paleontology in Rhode Island

References

 

Rhode Island
Stratigraphic units
Stratigraphy of Rhode Island
Rhode Island geography-related lists
United States geology-related lists